The Prophet Speaks is the 40th studio album by Northern Irish singer-songwriter Van Morrison, and the second to feature jazz organist and trumpeter Joey DeFrancesco. Released on 7 December 2018 by Exile Productions and Caroline Records, it was his fourth album "of new material in just fifteen months".

Critical reception

The Prophet Speaks received generally positive reviews, with Metacritic giving it 73 / 100, based on 11 reviews. It delivered "excellent songs, expertly rendered", leading The Observer to conclude that "Van Morrison’s current prolificacy clearly hasn’t compromised the quality of his output at all – this is another thoroughly enjoyable mix of vocal jazz and bluesy R&B." Rolling Stone heralded it as "further proof that he’s still one of the most moving, unrivaled singers of his generation", suggesting that Morrison wants to convey "that he’s able to write old-time originals that are mostly indistinguishable" from the classics he covers. Its review finds it "moving to hear Morrison revert back to his primordial roots", but finds that the album "feels like another headstrong gesture of self-determination". The Irish Times deemed it a "pleasure and a privilege to luxuriate" in the "exemplary" musicianship, concluding that "[at] his imperial best, Van the Man can still be mystical and magical after all these years.

Track listing

Personnel
Van Morrison - vocals, alto saxophone, harmonica
Joey DeFrancesco - organ, keyboards, trumpet
Dan Wilson - acoustic and electric guitar
Troy Roberts - acoustic bass, tenor saxophone, soprano saxophone
Michael Ode - drums
Jim Stern - tambourine, recording, mixing
Shana Morrison - backing vocals on "Gotta Get You Off My Mind" and "Spirit Will Provide"

Charts

References

2018 albums
Van Morrison albums
Caroline Records albums